Nalli Kuppuswami Chetti (born 9 November 1940) is a successful textile industrialist and philanthropist. He is a liberal donor for arts, culture and education. After the death of his grandfather, Nalli Chinnasamy Chetti, in 1958, he inherited the family business trademarked Nalli Silks. He has written three Tamil books namely, Vetrikku Moondre Padigal, Needhi Noolgalil Nirvagam, and Padagacheri Mahan.

Early life 
He was born in 1940 in Kanchipuram into a Padmashali family. He went to Ramakrishna Mission School. He did his business management from the University of Washington.

Organisations and affiliations 
He is now President of Sri Krishna Gana Sabha, Sri Parthasarathy Swami Sabha, Brahma Gana Sabha, Sri Bhairavi Gana Sabha, Mudhra, Mylapore Fine Arts Club and Chennai Cultural Academy. Vice President of Madras Film Society and Mylapore Academy.
He is also a Patron of Tamil Chamber of Commerce, Chetti is also a member in other Chambers like Indo Australian Chamber and Indo-Japan Chamber. Now a Member of the Planning Board of the Tamil University, Thanjavur, he has been a Member of the Senate, Bharathiar University, Member, Central Silk Board and Member, South Zone Cultural Centre, Chennai and Patron of The Madras Progress Union Higher Secondary School.

Awards and accolades

References

External links 

1940 births
Businesspeople from Chennai
Living people
Indian businesspeople in textiles
Recipients of the Padma Shri in trade and industry
University of Washington Foster School of Business alumni
Ramakrishna Mission schools alumni